Richard Paul Ohrnberger (born February 14, 1986) is a sports news satirist and former American football offensive guard. He was drafted by the New England Patriots 123rd overall in the fourth round of the 2009 NFL Draft. He played college football at Penn State.

Ohrnberger has also played for the Arizona Cardinals and San Diego Chargers.

Early years
Ohrnberger was a three-year letterman and two-year captain in football at East Meadow High School in East Meadow, New York, where he also lettered in lacrosse. He was named New York AA Player-of-the-Year in 2003 and was a two-time all-conference, two-time all-county, all-metro and All-Long Island selection. He won the Thorp and Martone awards, given to Nassau County's most outstanding player and most outstanding lineman, respectively.

Ohrnberger played in both the Governor's Bowl and Empire Challenge high school all-star games.

College career
Ohrnberger started every game in 2007 at left guard and was named second-team All-Big Ten.

In 2008, Ohrnberger earned third-team Associated Press All-America honors while paving the way for the NCAA's 15th-best rushing offense. He was also named first-team All-Big Ten that season, and played in the 2009 Texas vs. The Nation Game.

Ohrnberger earned a reputation as a class clown and prankster while at Penn State. Perhaps his most infamous prank involved impersonating teammate A. Q. Shipley during an October 2008, conference call interview with reporters. He performed stand-up comedy at the Hollywood Improv during team activities prior to the 2009 Rose Bowl.

Professional career

New England Patriots
Ohrnberger was drafted by the New England Patriots in the fourth round of the 2009 NFL Draft, with a pick they ultimately obtained from trading cornerback Ellis Hobbs to the Philadelphia Eagles. He signed a four-year, $2.20 million contract on June 16, 2009. The deal included a $451,000 signing bonus. Ohrnberger was active for three games for the Patriots in 2009, seeing time at right guard with starter Stephen Neal injured and backup Dan Connolly lining up at fullback.

Ohrnberger was waived by the Patriots during final cuts on September 4, 2010. He cleared waivers and was re-signed to the team's practice squad the next day. He was promoted to the 53-man roster on September 29, 2010, before the team's Week 4 game. He was active for two games in the 2010 season, both as a reserve.

In 2011, Ohrnberger was on Injured Reserve during the Patriots AFC Championship run to Super Bowl XLVI.

Arizona Cardinals
Ohrnberger signed a contract with the Arizona Cardinals on August 1, 2012.

San Diego Chargers
Ohrnberger signed with the San Diego Chargers on March 21, 2013. On September 10, 2014 Ohrnberger became a starter after the Chargers center Nick Hardwick was placed on the injured reserve.

Personal life
Ohrnberger earned a reputation as a class clown and prankster while at Penn State. Perhaps his most infamous prank involved impersonating teammate A.Q. Shipley during an October 2008 conference call with reporters. In addition, he performed stand-up comedy at the Hollywood Improv during team activities prior to the 2009 Rose Bowl. Ohrnberger has a reputation for off-color humor. Ohrnberger currently hosts a sports radio show in San Diego with Mark Willard, The Mark and Rich Show on XTRA Sports 1360. This show has given birth to Dicky Fowlberger, a character created by a game on the show called The List, due to its sponsorship by Cobra Puma and Mark Willard's love of Ricky Fowler.

In 2019, Ohrnberger was a radio color commentator for San Diego Fleet games, working alongside play-by-play Jon Schaeffer.

References

External links

Arizona Cardinals bio
New England Patriots bio
Penn State Nittany Lions bio

1986 births
Living people
People from East Meadow, New York
Players of American football from New York (state)
American football offensive guards
American football centers
Penn State Nittany Lions football players
New England Patriots players
Arizona Cardinals players
San Diego Chargers players
Sportspeople from Nassau County, New York
East Meadow High School alumni